Club Athlétique de Société Générale, also known as CASG Paris was a French football club. Founded in 1903 it was the sporting club for the bank Société Générale and they got the nickname "The Bankers". In 1917 the team played with a sky blue and white striped jersey. The club changed its name in 1919 to Club athlétique des sports généraux (Athletic Club of General Sports) after the request of FFF. Since then people called them "The Generals". The club were two-times winners of the Coupe de France, in 1919 beating Olympique de Paris by 3-2 and 1925 by defeating FC Rouen by 3-2 (replay match of a previous 1–1 draw), as well as winning the Union des Sociétés Françaises de Sports Athlétiques' Coupe des Alliés in 1915 and 1917, and three successive Coupe Nationales, between 1915 and 1917. The club was dissolved in 1951 as it merged with the Union Athlétique du XVIe Arrondissement (Athletic Union of the 16th district) and in the later years rugby became its only occupation. in 2020 the club is relaunched by Grézaud Victor who is its president and owner.

Honours

 Coupe de France: 2
 1919, 1925
Coupe des Alliés: 2
 1915, 1917
Coupe Nationale: 3
1915, 1916, 1917

References

Defunct football clubs in France
1903 establishments in France
1951 disestablishments in France
Association football clubs established in 1903
Association football clubs disestablished in 1951
Football clubs in Paris
16th arrondissement of Paris